Sweers may refer to:

People
 Isaac Sweers (1622–1673), Dutch vice-admiral
 Salomon Sweers (1611–1674), Dutch bookkeeper and counsel for the Dutch East India Company

Other
 Sweers Island, an island in Queensland, Australia
 HNLMS Isaac Sweers (1940), a Gerard Callenburgh-class destroyer
 HNLMS Isaac Sweers (1967), a Van Speijk-class frigate